SURF - Scotland's Regeneration Forum is the independent regeneration forum for Scotland. It seeks to improve regeneration policy and practice and works closely with policy-makers in the Scottish Government and its agencies. The organisation was established in 1992 and has offices in Glasgow and Edinburgh.

One of SURF's main activities is the annual SURF Awards for Best Practice in Community Regeneration, which has been running since 1998. The SURF Awards are delivered in partnership with the Scottish Government.

SURF also operates a programme called the Alliance for Action, which supports practical regeneration activities in several Scottish places including Govan, Kirkcaldy and Rothesay.

References

External links
 Official website

Organisations based in Glasgow
Organizations established in 1992
1992 establishments in Scotland
Urban renewal
Welfare in Scotland
Non-profit organisations based in Scotland
Companies based in Glasgow
Organisations supported by the Scottish Government
Interested parties in planning in Scotland
Town and country planning in Scotland